Damon Herriman is an Australian actor. He is known for his film and television work in Australia and the United States. He is perhaps best known for his portrayal of Dewey Crowe in Justified. In 2019, he portrayed the cult leader and criminal Charles Manson in both the Netflix series Mindhunter and in the Quentin Tarantino film Once Upon a Time in Hollywood.

Early life

Damon Herriman was born in Adelaide, South Australia. He began acting in local television commercials at the age of eight, but it was not until he was cast as Frank Errol in The Sullivans two years later that his career began to take off. He continued to work solidly as a child actor, with a return to The Sullivans a year later, as well as the Australian series The Patchwork Hero, Sara Dane, For the Term of His Natural Life and Taurus Rising. He received three Logie Award nominations for his performance in The Sullivans.

Career

After appearing in The Flying Doctors, for which he won the Penguin Award for Excellence in a Performance by a Juvenile, and the children's mini-series Elly & Jools, Herriman was cast as Mark Jorgensen, the bespectacled best friend of Ben Mendelsohn's Danny Clark in the Australian cult comedy classic The Big Steal.

As well as continuing to work solidly in film, television and theatre, Herriman has also written and/or directed many successful short films, including the Tropfest finalists They and The Date. In 2004, he won the Best Screenplay award at Flickerfest for the short film Soar, in which he also performed. He was a performer and contributing writer on the ABC sketch comedy series, The Elegant Gentleman's Guide to Knife Fighting.

Herriman's other Australian work includes playing Claudia Karvan's workmate and friend George Wagstaffe in the critically acclaimed Foxtel series Love My Way; Marcus Dwyer in the comedy series, Laid; simpleton Reg in the Australian feature, 100 Bloody Acres; as well as the title role in the ABC telemovie, The Outlaw Michael Howe. In 2014, he was seen as manager Chris Murphy in the miniseries INXS: Never Tear Us Apart, as well as appearing in Josh Lawson's debut feature, The Little Death. Other recent Australian credits include Abe Forsythe's feature, Down Under; the Foxtel series, Secret City and Mr Inbetween; the Oscar nominated short, The Eleven O'Clock; the ABC telemovie, Riot; Jennifer Kent's second feature, The Nightingale; and the Foxtel mini-series, Lambs of God. In 2019 he won the AACTA award for Best Lead Actor in a film for his performance in Judy and Punch.

His American career began in 2004, playing the creepy roadkill truck driver in the US horror film House of Wax. Since 2005 he has worked regularly in the United States, starting with such productions as The Unit; Redbelt (both written and directed by David Mamet); Breaking Bad; Wilfred; Cold Case; and mysterious hitman Mr. Jones on the CBS crime series, Vegas.

He played the convicted kidnapper of the Lindbergh baby, Bruno Hauptmann, in the Clint Eastwood-directed J. Edgar (2011), and one of the Cavendish gang in Gore Verbinski's The Lone Ranger (2013). Next he appeared in the Vince Gilligan/David Shore series for CBS, Battle Creek; the homeless Romeo in the Starz limited series, Flesh and Bone; and the violent hitman Buddy in the first season of the HBO/Cinemax series, Quarry. In 2019, he played Charles Manson in both Quentin Tarantino's film Once Upon a Time in Hollywood and the television series Mindhunter.

In 2019, he appeared as Paul Allen Brown in Steven Conrad's Epix series Perpetual Grace, LTD. In 2021, he was the voice of Kabal in Mortal Kombat, with stuntman Daniel Nelson portraying the character in the suit.

Filmography

Film

Television

Music Video Appearances

Awards

In 2018 he was awarded the Orry-Kelly Award, recognising a body of work that contributes to Australia's national identity.

Other works

Music
 2015: "Raining Gold" – ARO (Aimee Osbourne)

References

External links

 

1970 births
Living people
20th-century Australian male actors
21st-century Australian male actors
AACTA Award winners
Australian male child actors
Australian male film actors
Australian male television actors
Logie Award winners
Male actors from Adelaide